Connors Brothers Limited was a fish packing company founded by Lewis and Patrick Connors in the 1880s and based in Blacks Harbour, New Brunswick. It is known by the Brunswick brand, and is the only remaining producer of sardines in North America. Brunswick claims to be the largest sardine producer in the world.

Connors Brothers was purchased by George Weston in 1967, and merged with BC Packers (Clover Leaf Seafood brand) of Steveston, British Columbia in 1995 before selling off the Clover Leaf brand in 1999. Cloverleaf and Bumblebee brands were merged, then re-merged with the Connors Brothers to become the Connors Brothers Income Fund in 2004. This company was acquired by Centre Partners, a middle market private equity firm in 2008. In 2010, Connors Brothers (now part of Bumble Bee Foods) was sold to a British Private equity firm Lion Capital LLP.

References

Companies based in New Brunswick
Defunct food and drink companies of Canada